is a Japanese former cyclist. He competed in the points race event at the 1984 Summer Olympics. He is also a professional keirin cyclist.

References

External links
 

1962 births
Living people
Japanese male cyclists
Olympic cyclists of Japan
Cyclists at the 1984 Summer Olympics
Sportspeople from Akita Prefecture
Keirin cyclists